Eli Salama (born August 24, 1996) is a Canadian professional lacrosse defenceman playing with the Calgary Roughnecks of the National Lacrosse League (NLL), for whom he serves as an alternate captain, and Chrome Lacrosse Club of the Premier Lacrosse League (PLL). He previously played for the Dallas Rattlers of the MLL.

In college, Salama played for the Rochester Institute of Technology Tigers for four seasons and advanced to the NCAA Championship game with the Tigers 20 2017. In 2018, he was named USILA Division III Long-Pole of the Year, Liberty League Defensive Player of the Year, USILA First Team All-American and All-Liberty League First Team.  

Salama was drafted 12th overall in the 2018 NLL draft by the Calgary Roughnecks and joined the team in the 2019 season.

In the PLL, Salama plays long stick midfield for Chrome Lacrosse Club.

Statistics

NCAA

NLL

MLL

PLL

References

1996 births
Living people
Calgary Roughnecks players
Canadian lacrosse players
Dallas Rattlers players
Lacrosse people from British Columbia
Premier Lacrosse League players
RIT Tigers